Luís de Almeida Portugal Soares de Alarcão d'Eça e Melo Silva Mascarenhas, 2nd Marquis of Lavradio (27 June 1729 - 2 May 1790) was the 11th Viceroy of Brazil, the second one that ruled the colony after the seat of government was moved from Salvador to Rio de Janeiro. He was the son of a Marquis of the same title, D. António de Almeida Soares e Portugal and his wife, D. Francisca das Chagas Mascarenhas. During the 1762 Spanish invasion of Portugal, he commanded the 1st Cascais Infantry Regiment.

Biography
He was appointed Viceroy of Brazil in 1769, his government lasted 10 years. In his government, the Marquis of Lavradio promulgated the regulation of the diamond district. This regulation, made by the Marquis of Pombal, and promulgated by the charter of 10 July 1771, is a clear proof of how thorough was the spirit of the great minister and rigor with which he proceeded in these inspections. About this regulation the Brazilian writer Pereira da Silva wrote that it ordered him to: 'limit the number of residents in the diamond district, and state their professions, and invested the steward of almost dictatorial and absolute powers in all matters military, administrative, judicial and police, reporting directly to the metropolitan government, and without any dependence of the captains, generals. 

Amazing the thoroughness of his regiment. Frighten the precautions taken by the government. Severe penalties to prevent the smuggling themselves, that ever since the discovery was developed largely by the ease of transport and concealment of the product and, despite all precautions and important actions of the authorities, without humiliation story that residents were suffering, and hardship and untold barbarians who passed by, if not increased, not diminished however, continued its regular course otherwise progressive. 

The Marquis of Lavradio also had to contend with the caveat raised in Brazil, mainly in relation to the gentiles, the extinction of the Society of Jesuits. The system of indoctrination was not abandoned because they are exempted him and banished the Jesuits out of the Portuguese dominions. Not enough, and even finding themselves empowered for that purpose the existing religious orders in Brazil, the Capuchins fervently followed the footsteps of Jesuit priests and was employed in the missions dispatched to the interior, in charge of calling the nomadic tribes of social life, leading them to abandon their wild habits.

In 1779, two years after the death of King Joseph I of Portugal, the Marquis of Lavradio left the government of Brazil, being replaced by Luís de Vasconcelos e Sousa.

References

Colonial Brazil
1729 births
1790 deaths
People from Lisbon
18th-century Portuguese people
Portuguese colonial governors and administrators
Portuguese nobility